Devon is a small Canadian rural community in Nova Scotia's Halifax Regional Municipality with an approximate area of 152.79 square kilometers

It is located 32 kilometers north of Dartmouth near the Halifax International Airport on the Old Guysborough Road (Route 212). Its name is derived from Devonshire in the United Kingdom by settler farmers from that community who worked on the Oakfield estate on Shubenacadie Grand Lake.

Navigator

References
Explore HRM

Communities in Halifax, Nova Scotia
General Service Areas in Nova Scotia